The Electric Kool-Aid Acid Test is a 1968 nonfiction book by Tom Wolfe.  The book is a popular example of the New Journalism literary style. The book presents a firsthand account of the experiences of Ken Kesey and his band of Merry Pranksters, who traveled across the United States in a colorfully-painted school bus, Furthur, whose name was painted on the destination sign, indicating the general ethos of the Pranksters.  Kesey and the Pranksters became famous for their use of psychedelic drugs (such as LSD) to achieve expansion of their consciousness. The book chronicles the Acid Tests (parties with LSD-laced Kool-Aid), encounters with notable figures of the time (Hells Angels, Grateful Dead, Allen Ginsberg), and describes Kesey's exile to Mexico and his arrests.

Plot 
Wolfe chronicles the adventures of Ken Kesey and his group of followers. Throughout the work, Kesey is portrayed as seeking to create a new religion. Kesey gathers a group of followers based on the allure of transcendence achievable through drugs as well as his ability to preach and captivate listeners. The group was labelled as the "Merry Pranksters" and participated in a drug-fueled lifestyle. The "Acid Tests" — parties centered around LSD-laced Kool-Aid and carried out with lights and noise intended to enhance the psychedelic experience — started at Kesey's house in the woods of La Honda, California.

The Pranksters eventually leave the confines of Kesey's estate and travel across the country in a bus called Furthur. The bus is driven by Neal Cassady, who was the inspiration for the character Dean Moriarty in Jack Kerouac's 1957 novel On the Road. Throughout the journey, the individuals on the bus take acid frequently. As the Merry Pranksters gain popularity, Kesey's reputation develops as well. Towards the middle of the book, Kesey is idolized as the hero of a growing counterculture. Alongside this, Kesey forms friendships with groups like the Hells Angels and crosses paths with icons of the Beat Generation. His growing popularity provides Kesey and the Pranksters opportunities to meet other significant members of the growing counterculture including the Grateful Dead, Allen Ginsberg and attempt to meet with Timothy Leary. The failed meeting with Leary marks a greater failure to unite the counterculture from East to West coasts. This becomes one of the turning points in the book, indicating that the new generation of “hippies” had officially outpaced the old Beat Generation in style and philosophy.

In an effort to broadcast their lifestyle, the Pranksters publicize their acid experiences giving rise to the term Acid Test. They describe the goal of these parties as the pursuit of "intersubjectivity," a state beyond an individual's ego. As the Acid Tests are catching on culturally, Kesey is arrested for possession of marijuana. In an effort to avoid jail, he flees to Mexico and is joined by the Pranksters. The Pranksters struggle in Mexico and are unable to obtain the same results from their acid trips.

Kesey and some of the Pranksters return to the United States. At this point, Kesey becomes a full blown pop culture icon as he appears on TV and radio shows, despite being wanted by the FBI. Eventually, he is located and arrested. Kesey is conditionally released as he convinces the judge that the next step of his movement is an "Acid Test Graduation," an event in which the Pranksters and other followers will attempt to achieve intersubjectivity without the use of mind-altering drugs. The graduation is not effective enough to clear the charges from Kesey's name. He is given two sentences for two separate offenses. He is designated to a work camp to fulfill his sentence. He moves his wife and children to Oregon and begins serving his time in the forests of California.

Cultural significance and reception 

The Electric Kool-Aid Acid Test has been described as faithful and "essential" in depicting the roots and growth of the hippie movement.

The New Journalism literary style is seen to have elicited either fascination or incredulity by its audience. While The Electric Kool-Aid Acid Test was not the original standard for New Journalism, it is the most-often cited work of that genre. Wolfe's descriptions and accounts of the adventures of Kesey and his cohort were influential on the cultural perception of the figures and events in the book. Wolfe's style is particularly characteristic of New Journalism as he invites the reader to view the work as fiction rather than reportage. 

The book received modest literary acclaim, in particular for the clear narrative Wolfe maintained amidst the indulgent and often intoxicated milieu depicted. Despite Wolfe's immersion within Kesey's "movement" and advocacy of Kesey's and the Pranksters' ideology, he renders sober portrayals of their experiences as being triggered by both paranoia and the acid trips which had become the group's cultural motif. Wolfe chronicles the Prankster's day-to-day lives and numerous psychedelic experiences and his abstinence usefully differentiates his point of view. Wolfe endeavors to depict the Pranksters and Kesey within their environment and as he believes they themselves wished to be seen.

While some saw New Journalism as the future of literature, the concept was not without criticism. There were many who challenged the believability of the style and there were many questions and criticisms about whether accounts were true.  However, Wolfe challenged such claims and notes that in books like The Electric Kool-Aid Acid Test, he was nearly invisible throughout the narrative. He argues that he produced an uninhibited account of the events he witnessed.  As proponents of fiction and orthodox nonfiction continued to question the validity of New Journalism, Wolfe stood by the growing discipline.  Wolfe thought that this method of writing transformed the subjects of newspapers and articles into people with whom audiences could relate and sympathize.

The New York Times considered the book one of the great works of its time, and one writer described it as not only a great book about hippies, but the "essential book". The review continued to explore the dramatic impacts of Wolfe's telling of Kesey's story. Wolfe's book exposed counterculture norms that would soon spread across the country. The review notes that while Kesey received acclaim for his literary effort One Flew Over the Cuckoo's Nest, he was, for the most part, not a visible icon. His experiments and drug use were known within small circles, such as the Pranksters. Wolfe's accounts of Kesey and the Pranksters brought their ideologies and drug use into mainstream discussion.  A separate review maintained that Wolfe's book was as vital to the hippie movement as Norman Mailer's 1968 book The Armies of the Night was to the anti-Vietnam movement.

In addition to the praise that The Electric Kool-Aid Acid Test received from some outlets, the book has received criticism for its stylistic representations of counterculture and drug use. A review in The Harvard Crimson identified the effects of the book, but did so without offering praise. The review, written by Jay Cantor, who went on to literary prominence himself, provides a more moderate description of Kesey and his Pranksters. Cantor challenges Wolfe's messiah-like depiction of Kesey, concluding that "In the end the Christ-like robes Wolfe fashioned for Kesey are much too large. We are left with another acid-head and a bunch of kooky kids who did a few krazy things."  Cantor explains how Kesey was offered the opportunity by a judge to speak to the masses and curb the use of LSD. Kesey, who Wolfe idolizes for starting the movement, is left powerless in his opportunity to alter the movement. Cantor is also critical of Wolfe's praise for the rampant abuse of LSD. Cantor admits the impact of Kesey in this scenario, stating that the drug was in fact widespread by 1969, when he wrote his criticism.  He questions the glorification of such drug use however, challenging the ethical attributes of reliance on such a drug, and further asserts that "LSD is no respecter of persons, of individuality".

Asked in 1989 by Terry Gross on Fresh Air what he thought of the book, Kesey replied,

It's a good book. yeah, he's a — Wolfe's a genius. He did a lot of that stuff, he was only around three weeks. He picked up that amount of dialogue and verisimilitude without a tape recorder, without taking notes to any extent. He just watches very carefully and remembers. But, you know, he's got his own editorial filter there. And so what he's coming up with is part of me, but it's not all of me...."

Film adaptation 
Entrepreneur Alfred Roven first purchased the film rights shortly after the book was published. He passed on the rights to his children before his death, and after being introduced to Richard N. Gladstein through their attorney, they entrusted the film rights to him. Gladstein hired Gus Van Sant, who dedicated his 2002 film Gerry to Kesey, to direct, and he then hired Dustin Lance Black as scribe. Gustin Nash was later hired for rewrites, while Van Sant emphasized that while he was still working on the film, he was finding difficulty on how to get the project working.

References

External links 
 Official site

1968 non-fiction books
American travel books
Books about LSD
Books about the San Francisco Bay Area
Books by Tom Wolfe
Farrar, Straus and Giroux books
Memoirs about drugs
Non-fiction novels
Psychedelic literature